Dzhemal Kyzylatesh (born 14 March 1994) is a Turkish-born Ukrainian midfielder who plays for TFF Second League club Isparta 32 SK.

Career 
Of ethnic Turkish origin,  Kyzylatesh was born in Turkey and moved to Ukraine with his parents at the age of seven years. He is a product of the different Youth Sportive Schools from Kyiv, and his first trainer was Oleksiy Yakovenko.

Kyzylatesh's professional career continued, when he was promoted from Arsenal-Kyivshchyna on loan to FC Vorskla Poltava in the Ukrainian Premier League in July 2014. From July 2015 he signed full contract with Vorskla Poltava.

References

External links 
Profile at Official Site FFU (Ukr)

1994 births
Footballers from Istanbul
Ukrainian people of Turkish descent
Living people
Ukrainian footballers
Association football midfielders
FC Arsenal-Kyivshchyna Bila Tserkva players
FC Vorskla Poltava players
FC Arsenal Kyiv players
FC Kolos Kovalivka players
FC Volyn Lutsk players
Balıkesirspor footballers
Ukrainian Premier League players
Ukrainian First League players
TFF First League players
TFF Second League players